Steven Séance (born 20 February 1992) is a professional footballer who plays as a defender for  club Sedan. Born in France, he plays for the Haiti national team.

Club career 
On 23 June 2022, Séance signed for Championnat National side Sedan.

International career
On 25 March 2021, Séance made his international debut for Haiti in a 2–0 victory over Belize in 2022 FIFA World Cup qualification. He scored the second goal of the match.

Honours 
Paris 13 Atletico

 Championnat National 2: 2021–22

References

External links

Foot national Profile
USAMSM Profile

1992 births
Living people
Sportspeople from Gironde
Haitian footballers
Haiti international footballers
French footballers
French sportspeople of Haitian descent
Black French sportspeople
Association football defenders
Paris Saint-Germain F.C. players
US Torcy players
CS Meaux players
Olympique Noisy-le-Sec players
US Avranches players
Paris 13 Atletico players
CS Sedan Ardennes players
Championnat National 3 players
Championnat National players
Championnat National 2 players
Footballers from Nouvelle-Aquitaine